Lasiopetalum longistamineum is a species of flowering plant in the family Malvaceae and is endemic to a restricted area of New South Wales. It is a spreading shrub with its branches densely covered with woolly, rust-coloured hairs and has egg-shaped leaves and woolly-hairy flowers.

Description
The upper surface of the leaves is more or less glabrous and the lower surface is densely covered with white hairs, rust-coloured on the veins. The stamen filaments are three times longer than the anthers. Flowering occurs in spring.

Taxonomy
Lasiopetalum longistamineum was first formally described in 1905 by Joseph Maiden and Ernst Betche in the Proceedings of the Linnean Society of New South Wales from specimens collected by John Boorman on Mount Dangar, near Gungal in 1904. The specific epithet (longistamineum) means "long stamen".

Distribution and habitat
This lasiopetalum grows in grassy woodland and dry rainforest and is restricted to the Gungal-Mount Dangar area between Merriwa and Muswellbrook in eastern New South Wales.

Conservation status
Lasiopetalum longistamineum is listed as "vulnerable" under the Australian Government Environment Protection and Biodiversity Conservation Act 1999 and the New South Wales Government Biodiversity Conservation Act 2016.

References

longistamineum
Malvales of Australia
Flora of New South Wales
Plants described in 1905
Taxa named by Joseph Maiden
Taxa named by Ernst Betche